Jason Reinhardt (born October 31, 1969) is an American mixed martial artist. A professional MMA competitor from 2000 until 2011, Reinhardt fought in the UFC and King of the Cage.

Mixed martial arts career

Early career
After compiling a 1-0 amateur record, Reinhardt won the SFC Submission Fighting Championships professional bantamweight title on 11/3/2000 defeating Arizona fighter Ray Duke. He went on the following year to win the RSF Reality Submission Fighting Championships professional bantamweight title defeating WEC veteran Del Hawkins on 3/30/2001. He would have fights in many American organizations before fighting for King of the Cage in Calgary Alberta, Canada in 2005. From there Reinhardt faced Japanese star Hideo Tokoro in the main event of ZST 9 in Tokyo, Japan. This fight was changed to a grappling only match after Tokoro signed a contract the week prior to ZST 9, to face Royce Gracie in K-1: Premium 2005 Dynamite.

Ultimate Fighting Championship
Reinhardt made his UFC debut against submission specialist Joe Lauzon at UFC 78. He lost the fight via submission due to a rear naked choke in the first round.

Return to UFC
After a two-year layoff due to injury Reinhardt made his return to the UFC at UFC 127 in Australia facing Tiequan Zhang being defeated by guillotine choke at 0:48 of round 1.
 
Reinhardt faced Edwin Figueroa on August 14, 2011, at UFC on Versus 5. He lost the fight via TKO in the second round.

Following his loss to Figueroa, Reinhardt was released from the promotion.

Other Media

Reinhardt also appeared in the documentary The Man in the Arena about fellow MMA fighter.

Mixed martial arts record

|-
| Loss
| align=center| 20–3
| Edwin Figueroa
| TKO (elbows and punches)
| UFC Live: Hardy vs. Lytle
| 
| align=center| 2
| align=center| 0:50
| Milwaukee, Wisconsin, United States
| 
|-
| Loss
| align=center| 20–2
| Zhang Tiequan
| Submission (guillotine choke)
| UFC 127
| 
| align=center| 1
| align=center| 0:48
| Sydney, Australia
| 
|-
| Win
| align=center| 20–1
| Cody Larson
| Submission (armbar)
| Iowa Challenge 46
| 
| align=center| 1
| align=center| 1:37
| Iowa, United States
| 
|-
| Win
| align=center| 19–1
| Marcus Hermann
| TKO (submission to punches)
| Revolution Cage Fighting 10
| 
| align=center| 1
| align=center| 1:55
| Quincy, Illinois, United States
| 
|-
| Loss
| align=center| 18–1
| Joe Lauzon
| Submission (rear-naked choke)
| UFC 78
| 
| align=center| 1
| align=center| 1:14
| Newark, New Jersey, United States
| 
|-
| Win
| align=center| 18–0
| Theodore Reynol
| TKO
| Courage Fighting Championships 8
| 
| align=center| 1
| align=center| 2:00
| Decatur, Illinois, United States
| 
|-
| Win
| align=center| 17–0
| Jorge Conger
| Submission (armbar)
| Legends of Fighting 8
| 
| align=center| 2
| align=center| 0:57
| Indianapolis, Indiana, United States
| 
|-
| Win
| align=center| 16–0
| Ed Meyers
| TKO (submission to punches)
| Courage Fighting Championships 5
| 
| align=center| 1
| align=center| 1:59
| Decatur, Illinois, United States
| 
|-
| Win
| align=center| 15–0
| Mike Lindquist
| Submission (rear-naked choke)
| KOTC: Redemption on the River
| 
| align=center| 1
| align=center| 2:14
| Moline, Illinois, United States
| 
|-
| Win
| align=center| 14–0
| Joe Santiago
| Submission (armbar)
| KOTC: Firestorm
| 
| align=center| 1
| align=center| 4:30
| Calgary, Alberta, Canada
| 
|-
| Win
| align=center| 13–0
| Brad Cottrell
| TKO (punches)
| KOTC: Xtreme Edge
| 
| align=center| 1
| align=center| 1:37
| Indianapolis, Indiana, United States
| 
|-
| Win
| align=center| 12–0
| Tom Logsdon
| Submission (rear-naked choke)
| Courage Fighting Championships 2
| 
| align=center| 1
| align=center| 1:42
| Decatur, Illinois, United States
| 
|-
| Win
| align=center| 11–0
| Mike Lindquist
| Submission (armbar)
| Iowa Fighting Organization
| 
| align=center| 1
| align=center| 0:36
| Davenport, Iowa, United States
| 
|-
| Win
| align=center| 10–0
| Trent Bibbs
| Submission (armbar)
| Iowa Fighting Organization
| 
| align=center| N/A
| align=center| N/A
| Davenport, Iowa, United States
| 
|-
| Win
| align=center| 9–0
| Josh Delaney
| TKO (submission to punches)
| Extreme Challenge 55
| 
| align=center| 1
| align=center| 1:16
| Lakemoor, Illinois, United States
| 
|-
| Win
| align=center| 8–0
| Ryan Sotter
| Submission (triangle choke)
| Ultimate Submission Challenge
| 
| align=center| 1
| align=center| 3:28
| Bethalto, Illinois, United States
| 
|-
| Win
| align=center| 7–0
| Ben Carlson
| Submission (rear naked choke)
| Extreme Challenge 40
| 
| align=center| 1
| align=center| 1:36
| Springfield, Illinois, United States
|Featherweight bout.
|-
| Win
| align=center| 6–0
| Del Hawkins
| Submission (armbar)
| Reality Submission Fighting 3
| 
| align=center| 1
| align=center| 1:20
| Belleville, Illinois, United States
|Won the RSF Bantamweight Championship.
|-
| Win
| align=center| 5–0
| Ray Duke
| Submission (armbar)
| Submission Fighting Championships 12
| 
| align=center| 1
| align=center| N/A
| Collinsville, Illinois, United States
|Won the SFC Bantamweight Championship.
|-
| Win
| align=center| 4–0
| Zack Welker
| Submission (triangle choke)
| SC 2: Gladiators
| 
| align=center| 2
| align=center| 0:42
| Illinois, United States
| 
|-
| Win
| align=center| 3–0
| Charlie Hutchison
| KO
| SC 1: The Awakening
| 
| align=center| 1
| align=center| 0:00
| Canton, Illinois, United States
| 
|-
| Win
| align=center| 2–0
| Scott March
| Submission (armbar)
| GMAP
| 
| align=center| 1
| align=center| 3:11
| Springfield, Illinois, United States
| 
|-
| Win
| align=center| 1–0
| Sean Yoshida
| Submission (guillotine choke)
| Submission Fighting Championships 9
| 
| align=center| 1
| align=center| 0:32
| Belleville, Illinois, United States
|

See also
List of male mixed martial artists
List of Brazilian jiu-jitsu practitioners

References

External links
Official UFC Profile

American male mixed martial artists
American sportspeople in doping cases
Doping cases in mixed martial arts
Bantamweight mixed martial artists
Mixed martial artists utilizing Brazilian jiu-jitsu
Mixed martial artists from Illinois
Living people
1969 births
Place of birth missing (living people)
Sportspeople from Las Vegas
People from Decatur, Illinois
Ultimate Fighting Championship male fighters
American practitioners of Brazilian jiu-jitsu